Coton Green Football Club is a football club based in Tamworth, Staffordshire, England.

History
The club was established as a Sunday league team and played in the Tamworth & District Sunday League. In 2004 they switched to Saturday football, joining Division Three of the Midland Combination. The club won Division Three at the first attempt, earning promotion to Division Two. After finishing second in Division Two in 2006–07 they were promoted to Division One. The club were Division One runners-up the following season, securing promotion to the Premier Division. However, the club spent only one season in the Premier Division, finishing bottom of the table and being relegated back to Division One.

Coton Green remained in Division One until 2014 when the Midland Combination merged with the Midland Alliance to form the Midland League, with the club placed in Division Two.

After finishing second behind Cadbury Athletic in Midland League Division Two in 2021-22, Coton Green were promoted to Division One, thus returning to Step 6 of the National League System for the first time since 2009.

Ground
The club initially played at Whittington Barracks, before moving to Dosthill Park in 1988. In 1993 they moved to New Mill Lane of Fazeley Swifts, later becoming the main tenants of the site after Fazeley Swifts folded due to the changing rooms burning down in 1995. In 2008, the first team moved to Brereton Social's Red Lion Ground in order to meet the Midland Combination Premier Division ground grading requirement to have floodlights. They later returned to New Mill Lane, where floodlights were installed in 2016.

Staff

Managerial history

Honours
Midland Combination
Division Three champions 2004–05
Fazeley Charity Cup
Winners 2010–11, 2011–12

Records
Best FA Vase performance: Second qualifying round, 2015–16

See also
Coton Green F.C. players

References

External links

Football clubs in England
Football clubs in Staffordshire
Association football clubs established in 1982
1982 establishments in England
Sport in Tamworth, Staffordshire
Midland Football Combination
Midland Football League